Sylvio Breleur (born 13 October 1978) is a French Guiana former professional footballer who played as a striker.

International career

International goals
Scores and results list French Guiana's goal tally first, score column indicates score after each Breleur goal.

References

External links
 

1978 births
Living people
Sportspeople from Cayenne
Association football forwards
French Guianan footballers
French footballers
French Guiana international footballers
2014 Caribbean Cup players
Levallois SC players
Entente SSG players
K.S.K. Ronse players
S.V. Zulte Waregem players
R.F.C. Tournai players
K.V. Oostende players
French Guianan expatriate footballers
French expatriate sportspeople in Belgium
Expatriate footballers in Belgium